Igumnovskaya is a rural locality (a village) in Tarnogskoye Rural Settlement, Tarnogsky District, Vologda Oblast, Russia. The population was 239 as of 2002. There are 3 streets.

Geography 
Igumnovskaya is located 6 km northwest of Tarnogsky Gorodok (the district's administrative centre) by road. Malakhovsky Bor is the nearest rural locality.

References 

Rural localities in Tarnogsky District
Totemsky Uyezd